Cenellipsis elegans is a species of radiolarians in the order Spumellaria. It is described from the Paleocene of Western Kuban.

References

External links 

Species described in 1958
Prehistoric SAR supergroup
Polycystines
Kuban